News Corporation, stylized as News Corp, is an American mass media and publishing company headquartered in Midtown Manhattan, New York City. The second incarnation of the original News Corporation, it was formed on June 28, 2013, following a spin-off of the media outlets of the original News Corp as 21st Century Fox. Operating across digital real estate information, news media, book publishing, and cable television, News Corp's notable assets include Dow Jones & Company (publisher of The Wall Street Journal), News UK (publisher of The Sun and The Times), News Corp Australia, REA Group (operator of realestate.com.au), Realtor.com, and book publisher HarperCollins.

It is one of two companies that succeeded the original News Corporation, alongside 21st Century Fox—which consisted of broadcasting and media properties such as Fox Entertainment Group. The spin-out was structured so that 21st Century Fox was the legal continuation of the original News Corporation, with the new News Corp being a new company formed by a stock split. Following the acquisition of a majority of 21st Century Fox assets by The Walt Disney Company in 2019, Fox Corporation, which is News Corp's sister company and successor to the former 21st Century Fox, is also owned and controlled by the Murdoch family.

History

Formation 
On June 28, 2012, Rupert Murdoch announced that News Corporation's publishing operations would be spun off to form a new, publicly traded company. Murdoch stated that performing this split would "unlock the true value of both companies and their distinct assets, enabling investors to benefit from the separate strategic opportunities resulting from more focused management of each division". The move also came in the wake of a series of scandals that had damaged the reputation of multiple News Corporation-owned properties. Robert James Thomson, editor of The Wall Street Journal, was announced as the initial chief operating officer for the company; while Murdoch would not serve as CEO, he remained chairman and a shareholder of the new News Corp. Thomson promised that the new company would "cultivate a start-up sensibility even though we already work for the world's most established and prestigious diversified media and information services company" and would emphasize building new business models around its properties and content. The logo of the new News Corporation was unveiled at an investor presentation on May 28, 2013; the handwritten logo uses script based on Murdoch's own handwriting.

News Corp's board approved the split on May 24, 2013, while shareholders approved the split on June 11; Preliminary trading on the Australian Securities Exchange of the new News Corp's class B stock began on June 19, 2013, at around $15 per share; a value slightly lower than expected by some analysts. The shares fell in price by 3% to $14.55 per share, valuing the new company at around $7.9 billion US. The corporate split was finalized on June 28, 2013; during the stock splitting process, one share of the new News Corp was given to shareholders for every four shares they owned in the former News Corp. The current News Corp began trading on the NASDAQ stock exchange under the symbol "NWS" on July 1, 2013; at the same time, the former News Corporation (which encompassed purely of media properties, such as Fox Entertainment Group and 20th Century Fox) was renamed 21st Century Fox.

After the split 

On September 4, 2013, News Corp announced that it would sell the Dow Jones Local Media Group, a group of 33 local newspapers, to Newcastle Investment Corp.—an affiliate of Fortress Investment Group, for $87 million. The newspapers will be operated by GateHouse Media, a newspaper group owned by Fortress. Robert Thomson indicated that the newspapers "were not strategically consistent with the emerging portfolio" of the company. GateHouse then filed for prepackaged Chapter 11 bankruptcy on September 27, 2013, to restructure its debt obligations to accommodate the acquisition. Then GateHouse emerged from bankruptcy on November 26, 2013.

On December 20, 2013, News Corp announced its acquisition of Dublin, Ireland-based social news agency Storyful, a startup founded by journalist Mark Little. At the time, Storyful was described as "scour[ing] social-media services like Twitter and Instagram" to discover user-generated content—"breaking news and viral online content"—and after sourcing, to then verify, acquire, and distribute it. Storyful had, for instance, reported 2013 results of 750m views of user-generated videos by its partners. The cost of the Storyful acquisition was €18 million (£15m, US$25m), and marked News Corp's first acquisition since the split. News Corp CEO at the time, Robert Thomson, stated that the service had "become the village square for valuable video, using journalistic sensibility, integrity and creativity", and that with the acquisition, News Corp would "define the opportunities that the digital landscape presents, rather than simply adapt to them".

On May 2, 2014, News Corp acquired romance novel publisher Harlequin Enterprises from Torstar for $415 million. The deal closed on August 1; it is now operated as a subsidiary of News Corp's HarperCollins. On September 30, 2014, News Corp announced its acquisition of Move, Inc., a real estate listings company and owner of Realtor.com, a 20% stake of which was, at the time, owned by REA Group, a publicly traded subsidiary of News Corp Australia.

News Corp also began making investments in India in late 2014, such as a $30 million investment in real estate site ProTiger in November, the December 2014 purchase of BigDecisions.com, a financial planning website, and the acquisition of Indian media firm VCCircle in March 2015. In October 2015, News Corp sold its digital education brand Amplify to a management team supported by a group of private investors for an undisclosed sum. In June 2016, News Corp acquired Wireless Group (formerly UTV Media), a British radio broadcaster, for $296 million

In January 2020, News Corp sold Unruly, an outstream video ad marketplace, in exchange of 6.91% of Tremor Video stock. On July 31, 2020, James Murdoch resigned from the News Corp board of directors, "due to disagreements over certain editorial content published by the Company's news outlets and certain other strategic decisions."

On February 4, 2022, News Corp suffered a cyberattack from hackers believed to be linked to China. 

In February 2023, the company announced that it would be cutting 5% of its workforce across its various divisions.

Abandoned re-merger with Fox Corporation 
On October 14, 2022, it was announced that, under the instruction of Rupert Murdoch, a special committee had been established to explore a potential merger of Fox and News Corp, bringing the two companies back together after the former 21st Century Fox was spun-off from News Corp in 2013. On January 24, 2023, the proposed merger was abandoned by Murdoch.

Assets

The company consists of the former News Corp's newspaper and book publishing assets, together with the digital real estate advertising properties that are now its largest business and includes:
News UK, a British newspaper publisher (includes subsidiary News Ireland), and owners of radio broadcaster Wireless Group.
Dow Jones & Company, a New York City-based financial publisher, and owner of the Wall Street Journal, MarketWatch and Barron's
News Corp Australia, an Australian newspaper and magazine publisher, owns 65% of pay-TV provider Foxtel (which owns Fox Sports Australia) and REA Group
New York Post, a daily newspaper in New York City acquired by Rupert Murdoch in 1976. 
HarperCollins, a major book trade publisher
Tremor International, a video advertising platform (6.91%).

References

External links
 

 
2013 establishments in New York City
Mass media companies of the United States
Publishing companies of the United States
Companies based in Manhattan
Conglomerate companies of the United States
Mass media companies based in New York City
Multinational companies based in New York City
Publishing companies based in New York City
Conglomerate companies established in 2013
Mass media companies established in 2013
Publishing companies established in 2013
American companies established in 2013
Companies listed on the Nasdaq
Publicly traded companies based in New York City
Newspaper companies of the United States
Corporate spin-offs
Re-established companies